Francisco Mérida Pérez (born 4 March 1990) is a Spanish professional footballer who plays as a central midfielder for Chinese club Tianjin Jinmen Tiger.

He signed at the age of 17 with Arsenal from Barcelona, but only appeared in 16 official games over the course of three seasons with the club. Subsequently, he returned to his country with Atlético Madrid, where he also featured sparingly before leaving in 2012 (but winning the 2010 UEFA Super Cup). In La Liga he also represented Osasuna and Espanyol, having other brief spells abroad in Portugal, Brazil and China.

Mérida played for Spain at youth level.

Club career

Barcelona
Born in Barcelona, Catalonia, Mérida joined the youth ranks of FC Barcelona at the age of eight, but left the club in September 2005, being reportedly hidden away by his agent, Joseba Díaz, which led to speculation that he would leave with no compensation for the team; his parents had become uneasy about all the young players joining Barcelona and felt that he would have a better chance elsewhere; therefore, they approached Díaz, also Cesc Fàbregas' agent, and he promptly alerted Real Madrid, A.C. Milan and Arsenal, with the player eventually signing for the latter.

On 9 October 2007, Mérida was ordered by the courts to pay a fee around €3.2 million to Barcelona as compensation for his "failing to meet the terms of a personal pre-contract" with the club. The decision was said to have serious implications for clubs in England, where players were allowed to sign professional contracts at 17, one year earlier than in Spain; in response, a Madrid-based lawyer, Rodrigo García, was quoted as saying: "English teams will now think again before signing a young Spanish player ... It's an important ruling."

Arsenal
Mérida scored in his first-team debut for Arsenal in a friendly against Boreham Wood in August 2006. He signed professional terms with the Gunners after his 17th birthday.

Mérida's competitive debut came on 25 September 2007 when he came on as an added-time substitute for Eduardo da Silva in a 2–0 win against Newcastle United in the third round of the League Cup, and he went on to make two further appearances in the competition. On 3 April 2008, he extended his deal with the club by signing a long-term contract, being expected to play an important role in the future as manager Arsène Wenger described him as "an absolutely amazing player".

On 18 December 2007, Iñaki Badiola, prospective presidential candidate of Real Sociedad, claimed he agreed a loan deal for Mérida until the end of the season in Segunda División. On 9 January of the following year, five days after he won the elections, the move was confirmed. He started in seven of his 17 appearances for the Basques during his five-month spell and made six assists, but they failed to regain their La Liga status. He scored his first professional goal on 6 April 2008, the winner as his team came from behind to defeat Hércules CF 2–1 at Anoeta.

Mérida returned to Arsenal for the 2008–09 campaign, making his first start in a 6–0 victory over Sheffield United in the League Cup on 23 September 2008. On 2 March 2009 Wenger heaped praise on the player, claiming the reason for him making the bench for the previous few first team games was because "He has been doing very, very well. He looks really good in training and is getting stronger all the time."; he made his Premier League debut the following day – hours before his 19th birthday – coming off the bench for Samir Nasri in the dying minutes of a 3–1 win at West Bromwich Albion.

Mérida participated in the 2009 edition of the Emirates Cup. He replaced Aaron Ramsey midway through the second half of the team's first match, against Atlético Madrid, and started and created a goal for Eduardo against Rangers, a 3–0 win which certified the tournament's conquest. He was then included in the first team for the league season and handed shirt number 46 (later changing to 32), playing 20 minutes in the second match against Portsmouth.

On 28 October 2009, in that season's League Cup, Mérida contributed to a 2–1 home defeat of Liverpool, scoring from the edge of the area with the ball hitting the post on its way past goalkeeper Diego Cavalieri. After the game, Wenger confirmed how he came close to loan the player to Levante UD at the start of the campaign, changing his mind at the last minute because he had "too much quality" to let him leave. With his contract due to expire in June 2010, he said he was having talks with the club over a new deal and hoped they could come to an agreement, while Atlético Madrid president Enrique Cerezo showed his interest in bringing the youngster back to Spain if something wasn't worked out between player and club.

On 5 November 2009, Arsenal confirmed that Mérida had verbally agreed a deal with the club, but it had yet to be signed. Wenger then accused Atlético of tapping up the player after announcing their public interest of talking to him, saying "I can't say I'm annoyed by other clubs going after our players because we do it as well. But we do it legally." "The difference is that we do not do what is not allowed by the law. We try to get the best players everywhere when it is allowed by the rules."

Mérida made only eight official appearances for Arsenal during the season, including one against Bolton Wanderers on 17 January 2010 in which he scored his first Premier League goal in a 2–0 victory.

Atlético Madrid
On 25 May 2010, Atlético Madrid officially announced that Mérida was on his way to the Vicente Calderón Stadium on a free transfer, after refusing Arsenal's contract offer at the end of the campaign. He scored his first official goal for his new club on 27 October in a 5–0 win against Universidad de Las Palmas CF in the Copa del Rey, repeating the feat in the second leg (1–1 draw at the Vicente Calderón Stadium).

On 16 December 2010, Mérida scored his third goal for the Colchoneros, netting in his first touch in a 1–1 draw at Bayer 04 Leverkusen, with the defending champions of the UEFA Europa League crashing out after the group stage. He started 2011–12 on loan to S.C. Braga in Portugal. In late December 2011, however, after just eight official appearances (five in the Primeira Liga, 132 minutes overall), he was recalled by Atlético.

Hércules
On 8 August 2012, Mérida returned to the Spanish second division by signing a four-year deal at Hércules. His only goal during the second-tier season came from the penalty spot, against Real Madrid Castilla in a 4–2 home loss on 8 October, and he also received a straight red card in a 2–1 defeat at Real Murcia on 6 January 2013 for protesting the awarding of a spot-kick.

Atlético Paranaense
In February 2013, after rescinding his contract for a fee of €100,000, Mérida signed for one year with Brazilian side Clube Atlético Paranaense. An unused substitute for the first half of the Série A season, he made his debut on 19 September away to Clube de Regatas do Flamengo, scoring his team's first goal as they came from behind to triumph 4–2; he was the first Spaniard to score in Brazil since José Ufarte for Flamengo in 1964. A week later, in the year's Copa do Brasil, he was sent off for two bookings as a late substitute against Sport Club Internacional in the first game of the quarter-finals, being unused in both legs of the final, a 3–1 aggregate loss to Flamengo.

Mérida competed with the Furacão in the following year's Copa Libertadores, scoring in their penalty shootout victory over Sporting Cristal in the first stage. On 26 March 2014, in the group phase, he was ejected in a 3–1 home loss to Club Atlético Vélez Sarsfield. He left in July, as his contract was not extended.

Huesca
Mérida was without a club until 30 January 2015, when he signed a deal at SD Huesca until the end of the campaign in the Segunda División B. He played 15 games as they won Group B and promoted, scoring in a 2–0 win over Rayo Vallecano B at the Estadio El Alcoraz on 29 March.

On 3 December 2015, Mérida scored a penalty as his team beat top-flight club Villarreal CF 3–2 at home in the last 16 of the Spanish Cup, but in an eventual 4–3 aggregate defeat. A month later, he scored and was sent off in a 3–3 draw at neighbours Real Zaragoza.

Osasuna
On 21 July 2016, Mérida returned to the Spanish main division after agreeing to a deal with CA Osasuna. He made his debut for the club on 20 August, replacing fellow debutant Fausto Tienza and scoring the equaliser in a 1–1 away draw against Málaga CF.

Mérida contributed one goal in 31 matches in 2018–19, as his team returned to the top division as champions.

Espanyol
On 19 August 2020, the free agent Mérida moved to RCD Espanyol on a two-year contract with the option of a third. He played 36 times in his first season for the second-tier champions, but was a fringe player subsequently.

Tianjin Jinmen Tiger
Mérida signed for Chinese Super League side Tianjin Jinmen Tiger F.C. on 5 August 2022, on a free transfer.

International career
Mérida was part of the Spain under-17 squad which won the 2007 UEFA European Championship. In July 2007 he also played for the team in the 2007 FIFA World Cup in South Korea, with the national team finishing second to Nigeria in a shootout, with him missing the second penalty of the three taken.

Mérida was called up to the under-20 side for the 2009 World Cup held in Egypt: he starred in an 8–0 drubbing of Tahiti, scoring the fifth goal and providing an assist. In the next group game he continued his fine form and netted twice in a 2–0 win over Nigeria; after resting against Venezuela he played 70 minutes in the last-16 tie against Italy, which finished with a 3–1 loss.

Personal life
Mérida's sister, Sara, is also a footballer and a midfielder. She played mainly for RCD Espanyol.

Career statistics

Honours
Atlético Madrid
UEFA Super Cup: 2010

Osasuna
Segunda División: 2018–19

Espanyol
Segunda División: 2020–21

Spain U17
UEFA European Under-17 Championship: 2007
FIFA U-17 World Cup runner-up: 2007

References

External links

1990 births
Living people
Spanish footballers
Footballers from Barcelona
Association football midfielders
La Liga players
Segunda División players
Segunda División B players
FC Barcelona players
Real Sociedad footballers
Atlético Madrid footballers
Hércules CF players
SD Huesca footballers
CA Osasuna players
RCD Espanyol footballers
Premier League players
Arsenal F.C. players
Primeira Liga players
S.C. Braga players
Campeonato Brasileiro Série A players
Club Athletico Paranaense players
Chinese Super League players
Tianjin Jinmen Tiger F.C. players
Spain youth international footballers
Spain under-21 international footballers
Spanish expatriate footballers
Expatriate footballers in England
Expatriate footballers in Portugal
Expatriate footballers in Brazil
Expatriate footballers in China
Spanish expatriate sportspeople in England
Spanish expatriate sportspeople in Portugal
Spanish expatriate sportspeople in Brazil
Spanish expatriate sportspeople in China